Events in the year 1922 in the British Mandate of Palestine.

Incumbents
 High Commissioner – Sir Herbert Louis Samuel
 Emir of Transjordan – Abdullah I bin al-Hussein
 Prime Minister of Transjordan – Mazhar Raslan until 10 March; 'Ali Rida Basha al-Rikabi

Events

 2 April – The founding of the agricultural settlement Giv'atayim by a group of 22 Second Aliyah pioneers led by David Schneiderman.
 2 April – The founding of the agricultural settlement "Ahuza A – New York" (now Ra'anana), named after the founding company.
 3 June – The Churchill White Paper ts published endorsing the Balfour Declaration.
 24 July – The Mandate for Palestine, a legal instrument for the administration of Palestine, is formally confirmed by the Council of the League of Nations.
 22 August – Fifth Palestine Arab Congress held in Nablus.
 4 November – The founding of the kibbutz Beit Alfa by Hashomer Hatzair volunteers.
 5 December – The Jewish Agency for Israel is established.

Births

 28 January – Emile Habibi, Israeli Arab writer and politician (died 1996).
10 February – Eliyahu Bet-Zuri, Jewish Lehi activist known for his part in the assassination of Lord Moyne (died 1945).
 24 February – Pnina Salzman, Israeli pianist (died 2006).
 1 March – Yitzhak Rabin, Fifth Prime Minister of Israel, recipient of the Nobel Peace Prize (died 1995).
 12 March – Aviva Uri, Israeli painter (died 1989).
 11 May – Tawfik Toubi, Israeli Arab communist politician (died 2011).
 21 May – Moshe Amar, Israeli politician (died 2015).
 17 June – Avigdor Levontin, Israeli lawyer and diplomat (died 2016).
 22 June – Yehoshua Cohen, Israeli Lehi veteran, assassin of Folke Bernadotte (died 1986).
 5 July – Menachem Cohen, Israeli politician (died 1975).
 25 August – Ivry Gitlis, Israeli virtuoso violinist (died 2020).
 9 October – Asaf Simhoni, Israeli general (died 1956).
 1 December – Amichai Paglin, Israeli businessman and Irgun chief of operations (died 1978).

Deaths

 22 February – A. D. Gordon (born 1856), Russian (Ukraine)-born Zionist activist, founder of Hapoel Hatzair.
 16 December – Eliezer Ben-Yehuda (born 1858), Russian (Belarus)-born Jewish lexicographer and newspaper editor, the driving spirit behind the revival of the Hebrew language in the modern era.

References

 
Palestine
Years in Mandatory Palestine